The Council of Four Lands (Va'ad Arba' Aratzot) was the central body of Jewish authority in the Polish–Lithuanian Commonwealth from the second half of the 16th century to 1764, located in Lublin. The Council's first law is recorded as having been passed in 1580. Seventy delegates from local kehillot met to discuss taxation and other issues important to the Jewish community. The "four lands" were Greater Poland, Little Poland, Galicia (with Podolia) and Volhynia. The earliest form of the Council was organized in 1514 by Sigismund I the Old and Abraham of Bohemia was put in charge of it.

In Polish it was referred to as the Jewish Sejm. In Latin it was referred to as the Jewish General Congress (or ).

The terms "Council of Three Lands" and "Council of Five Lands" and more have also been used for the same body. In 1623 the Jewish communities from the Grand Duchy of Lithuania withdrew from the "Council of Four Lands" and established the "Council of the Land of Lithuania" (Va’ad Medinat Lita, sometimes translates simply as "the Council of Lithuania".)

Place in Jewish European life

The great number of the Jewish population of Poland, its importance in the industrial life of the country, and the peculiarities of the political and class organization of the Polish–Lithuanian Commonwealth were the reasons why the Jews of Poland formed a separate class enjoying liberal autonomy within the sphere of their communal and spiritual interests, the outcome of which was their exemplary communal organization. A Jewish community, with its administrative, judicial, religious, and charitable institutions, constituted a unit of self-government. The term "Kahal" denoted both the community (a community was also known as a Kahilah Kadisha or Holy Community) and the autonomous communal administration, the two concepts being identical. The administrative functions: the assessment of state and communal taxes, the supervision of charitable institutions, etc. of the Kahal were performed by elective Kahal elders, while its rabbis ("doctores Judæorum") had charge of religious and judicial affairs.

Number of delegates and frequency of meetings
During the second half of the seventeenth century the sessions of the Council occurred once or twice a year, more frequently at Yaroslav than at Lublin. The number of delegates cannot be exactly ascertained. One source notes that one representative to the Council was elected from each Kahal, and that to these Kahal delegates were added the six leading rabbis of Poland. It appears from the Kahal pinkeses that only the most important Kahals of each region sent their delegates to the Council.

The capitals (Poznań, Kraków, Lwów, and Ostrog) of the "four lands" each sent two or even more. The signatures of fifteen to twenty-five delegates—-though often the signatures of the six rabbis only-—are usually found attached to the extant decisions of the wa'ads. The total number of delegates, together with the rabbis, evidently reached thirty.

In the eighteenth century the operations of the Council became more and more limited; its sessions took place less regularly, mostly at Jaroslaw. One of the last important congresses was that held at Jaroslaw in the fall of 1753. Among other matters considered was the famous dispute between the rabbis Jacob Emden and Jonathan Eybeschutz over the Shabbethaian movement, resulting in the latter's acquittal on the charge of heresy in 1753.  However, this ruling was later overturned by the Council in 1756, when Eybeschutz was placed under ban.

Rabbi Eliyahu Ben Shmuel of Lublin states in the introduction to his book Yad Eliyahu that he remembers attending meetings of the Council of Four Lands as a child. He writes, "During my youth I was raised among many people of our nation, within the holy community of Lublin. In my days there was a meeting of scholars, the wise men of Yisrael, during the Gramitz Fairs every year... I imbibed their words thirstily..."

In 1764 the Polish Diet ordered the discontinuation of Jewish general congresses (Vol. Legum, vii. 50) and the activity of the Council of Four Lands came to an end. The reason for the Diet's decision was that the Council had failed to deliver the taxes it had collected. The subsequent partition of Poland among Russia, Austria, and Prussia, changing, as it did, the whole Kahal system, was unfavorable to the existence of such central autonomous bodies as the Council.

Activity
Its activity may be divided into four branches:
Legislative
Administrative
Judicial
Spiritual and cultural.

See also
Vaad

References

External links
 JewishEncyclopedia.com

Jewish Polish history
Rabbinical organizations
1764 disestablishments in Europe
1580 establishments in Europe
16th-century establishments in Poland
Jews and Judaism in Lublin
Jewish self-rule